Chutzpah is an Indian drama based web series on SonyLIV directed by Simarpreet Singh and premiered on SonyLIV on 23 July. The show is created by Mrighdeep Singh Lamba and produced by Dinesh Vijan. The series is produced under Vijan's  banner Maddock Films' digital content division, Outsider Films. Chutzpah is written by Amit Babbar and Mrighdeep Singh Lamba . The series features Tanya Maniktala, Elnaaz Norouzi, Varun Sharma, Diksha Singh and Manjot Singh. The show has been released in  Hindi, Tamil, Telugu and Malayalam and is streaming on Sony LIV from 23 July 2021. The series is about the weird and wild universe of the web.

Cast 
 Tanya Maniktala as Shikha
 Elnaaz Norouzi as Wild Butterfly/Sara Khan, a Camgirl
 Varun Sharma as Vikas Bhalla
 Manjot Singh as Rishi 
 Diksha Singh as Neena
 Gautam Mehra as Kevin
 Aashima Mahajan as Deepali
 Kshitij Chauhan as Prateek 
 Varun Tewari as John
 Pranali Rathod as Richa 
 Komal Singh as Pooja 
 Christopher Ramirez as George
 Ashwin Kaushal as Indian Boss
 Rachel Ann Mullins as Jeliene Scott 
 Preeti Kocchar as Vikas Mother 
 Babla Kocchar as Vikas Father
 Garima Agarwal	 
 R. Bhakti Klein

Episodes 
Episode 1: Login - 32 Min

Episode 2: If There Was Another World - 29 Min

Episode 3: Be Right Back - 26 Min

Episode 4: Main Timeline Hoon - 30 Min

Episode 5: Detox - 35 Min

Episode 6: Flavor Of The Month - 34 Min

Episode 7: Shadow - 44 Min

Reception 

This SonyLIV original series became the talk of the town soon after its release. While the audiences praised the show and the actors, the critics also had some positive things to say.
The show is praised for its relatability factor and the perfect portrayal of the online world.

Bollywood Life describes the show as “Chutzpah would make for a decently interesting watch”.

News 18 says that the show has caught the essence of the online world while also exploring and displaying the dark side of the web and the characters. They also said the show has “ moments that ensure laughter and uplift the mood”.

Archika Khurana from The Times of India wrote, "this seven-part series is aimed squarely towards the younger generation, for whom the internet and social media have become an inextricable part of their daily lives. However, it becomes entangled in its own web of clichés and sloppy execution, failing to connect well enough to make it a compelling watch. Despite its shortcomings, it is watchable to some extent if you have nothing else to do."

Filmi Beat praised the actors and the plot and also said “the maker's heart was in the right place”.

Rony Patra from LetsOTT gave the show 3 out of 5 and wrote, "Chutzpah is a brave and uncompromising look at the cyber lives of India's millennials in 2021".

Samrudhi Ghosh from Hindustan Times wrote, "The performances make up for some of Chutzpah’s flaws - Fukrey duo Varun and Manjot’s comic timing is on point, Gautam is convincing as the likes-obsessed content creator and Tanya has an endearing quality to her. However, the show never finds its way out of the pedestrian and does not have much to stop one from scrolling past."

Premise
The show is about five individuals and 1 story just connected through the internet showcases the power of social media and highlights the digital influence on the youth of today.

References

External links

 Watch Chutzpah  - Official Website

2021 Indian television series debuts
Hindi-language television shows